Love Your Dum and Mad is the debut studio album by British musician Nadine Shah, produced by Ben Hillier, and released in July 2013.

Track listing

Personnel
 Nadine Shah – composer, piano, treated piano, vocals
 Ben Hillier – producer, composer, bass, drums, guitar, piano, vibraphone, background vocals
 Neill MacColl – guitar
 Simon McCabe – guitar, guitar effects, background vocals, zither
 Jamie Miller – clarinet
 Geoffrey Mitchell – french horn
 Ben Nicholls – bass, background vocals
 Nick Webb – guitar
 Ferg Peterkin – engineer
 Bunt Stafford-Clark – mastering
 Matthew Stephens-Scott – paintings
 Matt Wiggins – assistant engineer

2013 debut albums
Nadine Shah albums
Albums produced by Ben Hillier